Patricia Lee Smith (born December 30, 1946) is an American singer, songwriter, poet, painter, and author who became an influential component of the New York City punk rock movement with her 1975 debut album Horses.

Called the "punk poet laureate", Smith fused rock and poetry in her work. Her most widely known song, "Because the Night", co-written with Bruce Springsteen, reached number 13 on the Billboard Hot 100 chart in 1978 and number five on the UK Singles Chart. In 2005, Smith was named a Commander of the Ordre des Arts et des Lettres by the French Ministry of Culture.<ref name="Ordre">{{cite web |title=Remise des insignes de Commandeur dans l'Ordre des Arts et des Lettres à Patti Smith 'Solidays |url=http://www.culture.gouv.fr/culture/actualites/conferen/donnedieu/patti_smith.html |publisher=French Ministry of Culture |location=Paris |language=fr |date=July 10, 2005|access-date=April 18, 2009}}</ref> In 2007, she was inducted into the Rock and Roll Hall of Fame.

In November 2010, Smith won the National Book Award for her memoir Just Kids. The book fulfilled a promise she made to her former long-time partner Robert Mapplethorpe. She is ranked 47th on Rolling Stone magazine's 100 Greatest Artists of All Time, which was  published in 2010 and was also a recipient of the 2011 Polar Music Prize.

Early life and education
Smith was born on December 30, 1946, at Grant Hospital in Chicago to Beverly Smith, a jazz singer turned waitress, and Grant Smith, a Honeywell machinist. The family was of part Irish ancestry and Patti was the eldest of four children, with siblings Linda, Kimberly, and Todd. When Smith was four, the family moved from Chicago to the Germantown section of Philadelphia, then to Pitman, New Jersey, and finally settled in the Woodbury Gardens section of Deptford Township, New Jersey.

At this early age, Smith was exposed to her first records, including Shrimp Boats by Harry Belafonte, Patience and Prudence's The Money Tree, and Another Side of Bob Dylan, which her mother gave her. Smith graduated from Deptford Township High School in 1964 and, following graduation, began work in a factory.Smith, Patti (2010). Just Kids, p. 20. HarperCollins, New York. . She gave birth to her first child, a daughter, on April 26, 1967, and placed her for adoption. She later entered Glassboro State College in Glassboro, New Jersey.

Career 
 1967–1973: New York 
In 1967, Smith left Glassboro State College and moved to Manhattan in New York City, where she met photographer Robert Mapplethorpe while working at a bookstore with friend and poet Janet Hamill. She and Mapplethorpe had an intense romantic relationship, which was tumultuous as the pair struggled with poverty and Mapplethorpe's sexuality. Smith considers Mapplethorpe to be one of the most influential and important people in her life, and referred to him as "the artist of my life" in her book Just Kids.

Mapplethorpe's photographs of Smith became the covers for Smith's albums, and they remained lifelong friends until Mapplethorpe's death in 1989. Smith's book and album The Coral Sea is an homage to Mapplethorpe and Just Kids tells the story of their relationship. She also wrote essays for several of Mapplethorpe's books, including one, at Mapplethorpe's request, for his posthumous Flowers.

Smith went to Paris with her sister in 1969, where she started busking and doing performance art. When Smith returned to Manhattan, she lived in the Hotel Chelsea with Mapplethorpe; they frequented Max's Kansas City. Smith provided the spoken word soundtrack for Sandy Daley's art film Robert Having His Nipple Pierced, starring Mapplethorpe. The same year, Smith appeared with Wayne County in Jackie Curtis's play Femme Fatale. She also starred in Anthony Ingrassia's play Island. As a member of the St. Mark's Poetry Project, she spent the early 1970s painting, writing, and performing. On February 10, 1971, accompanied by Lenny Kaye on electric guitar, she gave her first public poetry performance opening for Gerard Malanga.

Later in 1969, Smith performed one night in Cowboy Mouth, a play she co-wrote with Sam Shepard. The published play's notes call for "a man who looks like a coyote and a woman who looks like a crow". She wrote several poems about Shepard and her relationship with him, including "for sam shepard" and "Sam Shepard: 9 Random Years (7 + 2)", that were published in Angel City, Curse of the Starving Class & Other Plays (1976).

Smith was briefly considered for the lead singer position in Blue Öyster Cult. She contributed lyrics to several of the band's songs, including "Debbie Denise", which was inspired by her poem "In Remembrance of Debbie Denise", "Baby Ice Dog", "Career of Evil", "Fire of Unknown Origin", "The Revenge of Vera Gemini", on which she performs duet vocals, and "Shooting Shark". She was romantically involved at the time with the band's keyboardist, Allen Lanier. During these years, Smith was also a rock music journalist, writing periodically for Rolling Stone and Creem.

 1973–1979: Patti Smith Group 

In 1973, Smith teamed up again with musician and rock archivist Lenny Kaye, and later added Richard Sohl on piano. The trio developed into a full band with the addition of Ivan Kral on guitar and bass and Jay Dee Daugherty on drums. Kral was a refugee from Czechoslovakia who had moved to the U.S. in 1966 with his parents, who were diplomats. After the Warsaw Pact invasion of Czechoslovakia in 1968, he decided not to return.

Financed by Sam Wagstaff, the band recorded their first single, "Hey Joe/Piss Factory" in 1974. The A-side was a version of the rock standard with the addition of a spoken word piece about fugitive heiress Patty Hearst, which included the lyrics, "Patty Hearst, you're standing there in front of the Symbionese Liberation Army flag with your legs spread, I was wondering were you gettin' it every night from a black revolutionary man and his women ...". Hearst had been confined against her will and had been repeatedly threatened with execution and raped. The B-side describes the helpless alienation Smith felt while working on a factory assembly line and the salvation she dreams of achieving by escaping to New York. In a 1996 interview on artistic influences during her younger years, Smith said, "I had devoted so much of my girlish daydreams to Rimbaud. Rimbaud was like my boyfriend."

Later that same year, she performed "I Wake Up Screaming", a poem, on The Whole Thing Started with Rock & Roll Now It's Out of Control album, an album by The Doors''' Ray Manzarek.

In March 1975, Smith's group, the Patti Smith Group, began a two-month weekend set of shows at CBGB in New York City with the band Television. The Patti Smith Group was spotted by Clive Davis, who signed them to Arista Records. Later in 1975, they recorded their first album, Horses, produced by John Cale amid some tension. The album fused punk rock and spoken poetry and begins with a cover of Van Morrison's "Gloria", and Smith's opening words: "Jesus died for somebody's sins but not mine", an excerpt from "Oath", one of Smith's early poems. The austere cover photograph by Mapplethorpe has become one of rock's classic images. As punk rock grew in popularity, the Patti Smith Group toured the U.S. and Europe. The rawer sound of the group's second album, Radio Ethiopia, reflected this. Considerably less accessible than Horses, Radio Ethiopia initially received poor reviews. However, several of its songs have stood the test of time, and Smith still performs them live. She has said that Radio Ethiopia was influenced by the band MC5.

On January 23, 1977, while touring in support of Radio Ethiopia, Smith accidentally danced off a high stage in Tampa, Florida, and fell 15 feet into a concrete orchestra pit, breaking several neck vertebrae. The injury required a period of rest and an intensive round of physical therapy, during which time she was able to reassess, re-energize, and reorganize her life.

The Patti Smith Group produced two further albums before the end of the 1970s. Easter (1978) was their most commercially successful record, including the band's top single "Because the Night", which was co-written with Bruce Springsteen. Wave (1979) was less successful, although the songs "Frederick" and "Dancing Barefoot" both received commercial airplay.

1980–1995: Marriage

Before the release of Wave, Smith separated from her long-time partner Allen Lanier and met Fred "Sonic" Smith, the former guitar player for Detroit rock band MC5 and Sonic's Rendezvous Band. Like Smith, Lanier adored poetry. Waves "Dancing Barefoot", which was inspired by Jeanne Hébuterne and her tragic love for Amedeo Modigliani, and "Frederick" were both dedicated to him. The running joke at the time was that she married Fred only because she would not have to change her name. They had a son, Jackson (b. 1982), who went on to marry   Meg White, drummer for The White Stripes, in 2009, and a daughter, Jesse Paris (b. 1987), who is a musician and composer.

Through most of the 1980s, Smith was in semi-retirement from music, living with her family north of Detroit in St. Clair Shores, Michigan. In June 1988, she released the album Dream of Life, which included the song "People Have the Power". Fred Smith died of a heart attack on November 4, 1994. Shortly afterward, Patti faced the unexpected death of her brother Todd.

When her son Jackson turned 14, Smith decided to move back to New York City. After the impact of these deaths, her friends Michael Stipe of R.E.M. and Allen Ginsberg, who she has known since her early years in New York, urged her to go return to live music and touring. She toured briefly with Bob Dylan in December 1995, which is chronicled in a book of photographs by Stipe.

 1996–2003: Re-emergence 
In 1996, Smith worked with her long-time colleagues to record Gone Again, featuring "About a Boy", a tribute to Kurt Cobain, the former lead singer of Nirvana who committed suicide in 1994. That same year, she collaborated with Stipe on "E-Bow the Letter", a song on R.E.M.'s New Adventures in Hi-Fi, which she performed live with the band. After the release of Gone Again, Smith recorded two further albums, Peace and Noise in 1997, which included the single "1959" about the invasion of Tibet, and Gung Ho in 2000, which included songs about Ho Chi Minh and Smith's late father. Smith was nominated for the Grammy Award for Best Female Rock Vocal Performance for two of the "1959" and "Glitter in Their Eyes".

A box set of Smith's work up to that time, The Patti Smith Masters, was released in 1996. In 2002, Smith released Land (1975–2002), a two-CD compilation that includes a cover of Prince's "When Doves Cry". Smith's solo art exhibition Strange Messenger was hosted at The Andy Warhol Museum in Pittsburgh on September 28, 2002.

 2004–2009 

On April 27, 2004, Smith released Trampin', which included several songs about motherhood, partly in tribute to Smith's mother, who died two years earlier. It was her first album on Columbia Records, which later became a sister label to her Arista Records, her previous label. Smith curated the Meltdown festival in London on June 25, 2005, in which she performed Horses live in its entirety for the first time. This live performance was released later in 2004 as Horses/Horses.

In July 2005, Smith was named a Commander of the Ordre des Arts et des Lettres by the French Ministry of Culture. In addition to Smith's influence on rock music, the Minister noted Smith's appreciation of Arthur Rimbaud. In August 2005, Smith gave a literary lecture about the poems of Rimbaud and William Blake. On October 15, 2006, Patti Smith performed a 3½-hour tour de force show to close out at CBGB, which had been an influential New York City live music venue for much of the late 20th and early 21st centuries. At the CBGB show, Smith took the stage at 9:30 p.m. (EDT) and closed the night (and the venue) at a few minutes after 1:00 am, performing her song "Elegie", and finally reading a list of punk rock musicians and advocates who had died in the previous years.

Smith was inducted into the Rock and Roll Hall of Fame on March 12, 2007. She dedicated her award to the memory of her late husband, Fred, and performed a cover of The Rolling Stones' "Gimme Shelter". As the closing number of the Rock and Roll Hall of Fame Induction Ceremony, Smith's "People Have the Power" was used for the big celebrity jam that traditionally ends the program. Smith's cover of "Gimme Shelter" appeared on her tenth album, Twelve, an all-covers album released in April 2007 by Columbia Records.

From November 2006 to January 2007, an exhibition called 'Sur les Traces' at Trolley Gallery, London, featured polaroid prints taken by Smith and donated to Trolley to raise awareness and funds for the publication of Double Blind: Lebanon Conflict 2006, a book with photographs by Paolo Pellegrin, a member of Magnum Photos. She also participated in the DVD commentary for Aqua Teen Hunger Force Colon Movie Film for Theaters. From March 28 to June 22, 2008, the Fondation Cartier pour l'Art Contemporain in Paris hosted a major exhibition of the visual artwork of Land 250, drawn from pieces created by Smith between 1967 and 2007. At the 2008 Rowan Commencement ceremony, Smith received an honorary doctorate degree for her contributions to popular culture.

Smith was the subject of a 2008 documentary film by Steven Sebring, Patti Smith: Dream of Life. A live album by Smith and Kevin Shields, The Coral Sea, was released in July 2008. On September 10, 2009, after a week of smaller events and exhibitions in Florence, Smith played an open-air concert at Piazza Santa Croce, commemorating her performance in the same city 30 years earlier. She contributed the introduction to Jessica Lange's book 50 Photographs, published in 2009.

 2010–present 
Smith's book, Just Kids, a memoir of her time in Manhattan in the 1970s and her relationship with Robert Mapplethorpe, was published in 2010; it won the National Book Award for Nonfiction later that year. In 2018, a new edition of Just Kids, including additional photographs and illustrations, was published. Smith also headlined a benefit concert headed by bandmate Tony Shanahan, for Court Tavern in New Brunswick, New Jersey. Smith's set included "Gloria", "Because the Night", and "People Have the Power".

In 2010, Smith had a brief cameo in Jean-Luc Godard's Film Socialisme, which was first screened at the 2010 Cannes Film Festival.

In 2012, Smith was awarded an honorary doctorate in fine arts from Pratt Institute in Brooklyn. Following the conferral of her degree, Smith delivered the commencement address and played two songs along with long-time band member Lenny Kaye. In her commencement address, Smith said that when she moved to New York City in 1967, she would never have been accepted into Pratt but most of her friends (including Mapplethorpe) were students at Pratt and she spent countless hours on the Pratt campus. She added that it was through her friends and Pratt professors that she learned many of her own artistic skills.

In 2011, Smith was one of several Polar Music Prize winners. She made her television acting debut at age 64 on the TV series Law & Order: Criminal Intent, appearing in an episode titled "Icarus". In 2011, Smith was working on a crime novel set in London. "I've been working on a detective story that starts at the St Giles in the Fields church in London for the last two years", she told NME, adding that she "loved detective stories" and was a fan of British fictional detective Sherlock Holmes and U.S. crime author Mickey Spillane in her youth.

Following the death of her husband in 1994, Smith began devoting time to what she terms "pure photography", a method of capturing still objects without using a flash. In 2011, Smith announced the first museum exhibition of her photography in the U.S., Camera Solo. She named the project after a sign she saw in the abode of Pope Celestine V, which translates as "a room of one's own", and which Smith felt best described her solitary method of photography. The exhibition featured artifacts that were everyday items or places of significance to artists Smith admires, including Rimbaud, Charles Baudelaire, John Keats, and William Blake. In February 2012, she was a guest at the Sanremo Music Festival.

Smith recorded a cover of Buddy Holly's "Words of Love" for the CD Rave on Buddy Holly, a tribute album tied to Holly's 75th birthday, which was released June 28, 2011. She also recorded the song "Capitol Letter" for the official soundtrack of the second film of the Hunger Games series The Hunger Games: Catching Fire.

Smith's 11th studio album, Banga, was released in June 2012. American Songwriter wrote that, "These songs aren't as loud or frantic as those of her late 70s heyday, but they resonate just as boldly as she moans, chants, speaks and spits out lyrics with the grace and determination of Mohammad Ali in his prime. It's not an easy listen—the vast majority of her music never has been—but if you're a fan and/or prepared for the challenge, this is as potent, heady and uncompromising as she has ever gotten, and with Smith's storied history as a musical maverick, that's saying plenty." Metacritic awarded the album a score of 81, indicating "universal acclaim".

Also in 2012, Smith recorded a cover of Io come persona by Italian singer-songwriter Giorgio Gaber.

In 2015, Smith wrote "Aqua Teen Dream" to commemorate the series finale of Aqua Teen Hunger Force.  The vocal track was recorded in a hotel overlooking Lerici's Bay of Poets. On September 26, 2015, Smith performed at the American Museum of Tort Law convocation ceremony. On December 6, 2015, she made an appearance at the Paris show of U2's iNNOCENCE + eXPERIENCE TOUR 2015 and performed "Bad" and "People Have the Power" with U2.

In 2016, Smith performed "People Have the Power" at Riverside Church in Manhattan to celebrate the 20th anniversary of Democracy Now, where she was joined by Michael Stipe. On December 10, 2016, Smith attended the Nobel Prize Award Ceremony in Stockholm on behalf of Bob Dylan, winner of the Nobel Prize in Literature, who could not be present due to prior commitments. After the official presentation speech for the literary prize by Horace Engdahl, the perpetual secretary of the Swedish Academy, Smith sang the Dylan song "A Hard Rain's a-Gonna Fall". She sang "I saw the babe that was just bleedin’", the wrong words to the second verse, and was momentarily unable to continue. After a brief apology, saying that she was nervous, she resumed the song and earned jubilant applause at its end.

In 2017, Smith appeared as herself in Song to Song directed by Terrence Malick, opposite Rooney Mara and Ryan Gosling. She later made an appearance at the Detroit show of U2's The Joshua Tree 2017 tour and performed "Mothers of the Disappeared" with the band.

In 2018, Smith's concert-documentary film Horses: Patti Smith and her Band, premiered at the 2018 Tribeca Film Festival. In addition, Smith narrated Darren Aronofsky's VR experience Spheres: Songs of Spacetime along with Millie Bobby Brown and Jessica Chastain.

In January 2019, Smith's photographs were displayed at the Diego Rivera gallery in the San Francisco Art Institute and she performed at The Fillmore in San Francisco.

In 2019, Smith performed her anthem "People Have the Power" with Stewart Copeland and Choir! Choir! Choir! at Onassis Festival 2019: Democracy Is Coming. Later that year she released her latest book, Year of the Monkey.  "A captivating, redemptive chronicle of a year in which Smith looked intently into the abyss", stated Kirkus Reviews.

Smith was set to be awarded receive the International Humanities Prize from Washington University in St. Louis in November 2020; however, the ceremony was canceled due to the COVID-19 pandemic. In 2022, she was awarded an Honorary Doctor of Humane Letters from Columbia University.

In 2023, Smith was nominated for induction to the Songwriters Hall of Fame.

Legacy
One of the earlier references to Smith as an influence is by Todd Rundgren in his 1972 album Something/Anything?. In the liner notes, he writes that "Song of the Viking" was "written in the feverish grip of the dreaded 'd'oyle carte,' a chronic disease dating back to my youth. Dedicated to Miss Patti Lee Smith." Seven years later Rundgren produced the final Patti Smith Group album, "Wave."

Smith has been an inspiration for Michael Stipe of R.E.M.  Listening to her album Horses made a huge impact on him. In 2008, Stipe said, "I decided then that I was going to start a band."

In 1998, Stipe published a collection of photos, titled Two Times Intro: On the Road with Patti Smith. Stipe sings backing vocals on Smith's songs "Last Call" and "Glitter in Their Eyes". Smith sang background vocals on R.E.M.'s songs "E-Bow the Letter" and "Blue".

The Australian alternative rock band The Go-Betweens dedicated a track, "When She Sang About Angels" on the 2000 album The Friends of Rachel Worth, to Smith.

In 2004, Shirley Manson of Garbage spoke of Smith's influence on her in Rolling Stones issue "The Immortals: 100 Greatest Artists of All Time", in which Smith was ranked 47th. The Smiths members Morrissey and Johnny Marr share an appreciation for Smith's Horses, and revealed that their song "The Hand That Rocks the Cradle" is a reworking of one of the album's tracks, "Kimberly". In 2004, Sonic Youth released an album called Hidros 3 (to Patti Smith). U2 also cites Patti Smith as an influence.

In 2005, Scottish singer-songwriter KT Tunstall released "Suddenly I See", a single, as a tribute of sorts to Smith. Canadian actor Elliot Page frequently mentions Smith as one of his idols and has done various photo shoots replicating famous Smith photos, and Irish actress Maria Doyle Kennedy often refers to Smith as a major influence. In 1978 and 1979, Gilda Radner portrayed a character called Candy Slice on Saturday Night Live based on Smith.

Alternative rock singer-songwriter Courtney Love of Hole heavily credited Smith as a major influence on her; Love received Smith's album Horses in juvenile hall as a teenager, and "realized that you could do something that was completely subversive that didn't involve violence [or] felonies. I stopped making trouble," said Love. "I stopped." Hole's classic track "Violet" features the lyrics "And the sky was all violet / I want it again, but violent, more violent", alluding to lyrics from Smith's "Kimberly". Love later stated that she considered Smith's song "Rock n Roll Nigger" the greatest rock song of all time.

American pop singer Madonna has named Smith as one of her biggest influences. Anglo-Celtic rock band The Waterboys' debut single, "A Girl Called Johnny", was written as a tribute to Smith. In 2018, the English band Florence and the Machine dedicated the High as Hope album song "Patricia" to Smith. The lyrics reference Smith as Florence Welch's "North Star". Canadian country musician Orville Peck cited Smith as having had a big impact on him, stating that Smith's album Horses introduced him to a new and different way to make music.
Poetic singer songwriter Joustene Lorenz also cites Patti Smith as a 'powerful influence' on her life and music.

 Activism 

In 1993, Smith contributed "Memorial Tribute (Live)" to the AIDS-benefit album No Alternative.

Smith supported the Green Party and backed Ralph Nader in the 2000 United States presidential election. She led the crowd singing "Over the Rainbow" and "People Have the Power" at the campaign's rallies, and also performed at several of Nader's subsequent "Democracy Rising" events. Smith was a speaker and singer at the first protests against the Iraq War as U.S. President George W. Bush spoke to the United Nations General Assembly.  Smith supported Democratic candidate John Kerry in the 2004 election. Bruce Springsteen continued performing her "People Have the Power" at Vote for Change campaign events. In the winter of 2004–2005, Smith toured again with Nader in a series of rallies against the Iraq War and called for the impeachment of Bush.

Smith premiered two new protest songs in London in September 2006. Louise Jury, writing in The Independent, characterized them as "an emotional indictment of American and Israeli foreign policy". The song "Qana" was about the Israeli airstrike on the Lebanese village of Qana. "Without Chains" is about Murat Kurnaz, a Turkish citizen who was born and raised in Germany, held at Guantanamo Bay detainment camp for four years. Jury's article quotes Smith as saying:

In an interview, Smith stated that Kurnaz's family had contacted her and that she wrote a short preface for the book that he was writing, which was released in March 2008.

In March 2003, ten days after Rachel Corrie's death, Smith appeared in Austin, Texas and performed an anti-war concert. She subsequently wrote "Peaceable Kingdom", a song which was inspired by and is dedicated to Corrie. In 2009, in her Meltdown concert in Festival Hall, she paid homage to the Iranians taking part in post-election protests by saying "Where is My Vote?" in a version of the song "People Have the Power".

In 2015, Smith appeared with Nader, spoke and performed the songs "Wing" and "People Have the Power" during the American Museum of Tort Law convocation ceremony in Winsted, Connecticut. In 2016, Smith spoke, read poetry, and performed several songs along with her daughter Jesse at Nader's Breaking Through Power conference at DAR Constitution Hall in Washington, D.C.

A long-time supporter of Tibet House US, Smith performs annually at their benefit at Carnegie Hall.

In 2020, Smith contributed signed first-edition copies of her books to the Passages bookshop in Portland, Oregon after the store's valuable first-edition and other books by various authors were stolen in a burglary. Smith regards climate change as the predominant issue of our time, and performed at the opening of COP26 in 2021.

On February 24, 2022, Smith performed at The Capitol Theatre (Port Chester, New York) for the first time, saying, "I would be lying if I said I wasn’t affected by what is happening in the world" referencing the Russian invasion of Ukraine earlier that day. "Peace as we know it is over in Europe", she said. "This is what I heard in my sleep and goes through my head all day all night long like a tragic hit song. A raw translation of the Ukrainian anthem that the people are singing through defiant tears", she wrote on Instagram on March 6, 2022.

Beliefs
 Religion 
Smith was raised a Jehovah's Witness and had a strong religious upbringing and a Biblical education. She left organized religion as a teenager, however, because she felt it was too confining. In response to this experience, she wrote the line, "Jesus died for somebody's sins, but not mine", in her cover version of "Gloria" by Them. She has described having an avid interest in Tibetan Buddhism around the age of 11 or 12, saying "I fell in love with Tibet because their essential mission was to keep a continual stream of prayer," but that as an adult she sees clear parallels between different forms of religion and has concluded that religious dogmas are "... man-made laws that you can either decide to abide by or not."

In 2014, she was invited  by Pope Francis to play at Vatican Christmas concert. She commented: "It's a Christmas concert for the people, and it's being televised. I like Pope Francis and I'm happy to sing for him. Anyone who would confine me to a line from 20 years ago is a fool! I had a strong religious upbringing, and the first word on my first LP is Jesus. I did a lot of thinking. I'm not against Jesus, but I was 20 and I wanted to make my own mistakes and I didn't want anyone dying for me. I stand behind that 20-year-old girl, but I have evolved. I'll sing to my enemy! I don't like being pinned down and I'll do what the fuck I want, especially at my age...oh, I hope there's no small children here!" She performed at the Vatican again in 2021, telling Democracy Now! that she studied Francis of Assisi  when Pope Benedict XVI was still the pope. Smith called Francis of Assisi "truly the environmentalist saint" and said that despite not being a Catholic, she had hoped for a pope named Francis.

 Feminism and women in music 
According to biographer Nick Johnstone, Smith has often been "revered" as a "feminist icon", including by The Guardian journalist Simon Hattenstone in a 2013 profile on the musician.

In 2014, Smith offered her opinion on the sexualization of women in music. "Pop music has always been about the mainstream and what appeals to the public. I don't feel it's my place to judge." Smith historically and presently declines to embrace feminism, saying, "I have a son and a daughter, people always talk to me about feminism and women's rights, but I have a son too—I believe in human rights."

In 2015, writer Anwen Crawford observed that Smith's "attitude to genius seems pre-feminist, if not anti-feminist; there is no democratizing, deconstructing impulse in her work. True artists, for Smith, are remote, solitary figures of excellence, wholly dedicated to their art."

 Awards and nominations 
{| class="wikitable sortable plainrowheaders" 
|-
! scope="col" | Award
! scope="col" | Year
! scope="col" | Nominee(s)
! scope="col" | Category
! scope="col" | Result
! scope="col" class="unsortable"| 
|-
! scope="row"|ASCAP Pop Music Awards
| 1995
| "Because the Night"
| Most Performed Song
| 
| 
|-
!scope="row" rowspan=4|Grammy Awards
| 1998
| "1959"
| rowspan=2|Best Female Rock Vocal Performance
| 
| rowspan=4|
|-
| 2001
| "Glitter in Their Eyes"
| 
|-
| 2016
| Blood On Snow (Jo Nesbø)| rowspan=2|Best Spoken Word Album
| 
|-
| 2017
| M Train| 
|-
!scope="row"|Grammy Hall of Fame
| 2021
| Horses| Hall of Fame
| 
| 

 Band members 
Current
Patti Smith – vocals, guitar (1974–1979, 1988, 1996–present)
Lenny Kaye – guitar (1974–1979, 1996–present)
Jackson Smith – guitar (2016–present)
Tony Shanahan – bass guitar, keyboards (1996–present)
Jay Dee Daugherty – drums (1975–1979, 1988, 1996–present)

Former
Richard Sohl – keyboards (1974–1977, 1979, 1988)
Ivan Král – bass guitar (1975–1979)
Bruce Brody – keyboards (1977–1978)
Fred "Sonic" Smith – guitar (1988)
Kasim Sulton – bass guitar (1988)
Oliver Ray – guitar (1996–2005)
Jack Petruzzelli – guitar (2006–2016)

Timeline

 Discography 

 As a solo artist 
 Horses (1975)
 Dream of Life (1988)
 Gone Again (1996)
 Peace and Noise (1997)
 Gung Ho (2000)
 Trampin' (2004)
 Twelve (2007)
 Banga (2012)

 As Patti Smith Group 
 Radio Ethiopia (1976)
 Easter (1978)
 Wave (1979)

 Books 

 Cowboy Mouth (1971) play co-written with Sam Shepard
 Seventh Heaven 
 Early Morning Dream 
 A Useless Death 
 Witt 
 The Night 
 Ha! Ha! Houdini! 
 Babel 
 Woolgathering 
 Early Work 
 The Coral Sea 
 Patti Smith Complete 
 Strange Messenger 
 Auguries of Innocence 
 Poems (Vintage Classics) by William Blake. Edited by and with introduction by Patti Smith 
 Land 250 
 Trois 
 Great Lyricists; foreword by Rick Moody 
 Just Kids 
 Hecatomb  With 20 drawings by Jose Antonio Suarez Londono
 M Train 
 Devotion 
 The New Jerusalem 
 Just Kids (Illustrated edition) 
 at the Minetta Lane 
 Year of the Monkey 
 A Book of Days''

References

Further reading

External links

 
 
 
 
 
 
I Will Always Live Like Peter Pan. 70 min interview from the Louisiana Literature festival 2012. Video by Louisiana Channel.
Patti Smith: Advice to the young. Filmed at Louisiana Literature festival 2012. Video interview by Louisiana Channel.
Patti Smith: First encounters with Robert Mapplethorpe. Filmed at Louisiana Literature festival 2012. Video interview by Louisiana Channel.

 
1946 births
Living people
20th-century American artists
20th-century American guitarists
20th-century American poets
20th-century American singers
20th-century American women artists
20th-century American women guitarists
20th-century American women singers
20th-century American women writers
21st-century American artists
21st-century American non-fiction writers
21st-century American poets
21st-century American singers
21st-century American women artists
21st-century American women singers
21st-century American women writers
American contraltos
American human rights activists
American people of Irish descent
American punk rock guitarists
American punk rock singers
American rock songwriters
American spoken word artists
American women memoirists
American women poets
American women rock singers
American women singer-songwriters
Arista Records artists
Art rock musicians
Columbia Records artists
Commandeurs of the Ordre des Arts et des Lettres
Former Jehovah's Witnesses
Guitarists from Chicago
Guitarists from Michigan
Guitarists from New Jersey
Guitarists from New York City
National Book Award winners
Outlaw poets
.
People from Deptford Township, New Jersey
People from St. Clair Shores, Michigan
People from Woodbury, New Jersey
Poets from Michigan
Poets from New Jersey
Poets from New York (state)
Postmodern writers
Protopunk musicians
Punk poets
Rolling Stone people
Rowan University alumni
Singers from Chicago
Singer-songwriters from Illinois
Singer-songwriters from Michigan
Singer-songwriters from New Jersey
Singer-songwriters from New York (state)
Singers from New York City
The Minus 5 members
Women human rights activists
Women punk rock singers

nds:Patti Smith